Juho Talvitie (born 25 March 2005) is a Finnish professional footballer who plays as a winger for Belgian club Lommel and the Finland U19.

Club career

Early years

In 2020, Talvitie trialed for the youth academy of English Premier League side Manchester United.

Lommel

In 2021, he signed for Belgian First Division B club Lommel. On 15 September 2021, he debuted for 4–2 win over Diegem Sport in a Belgian Cup game. He made his Belgian First Division B debut on 1 October 2021 against Westerlo. During season 2021–22 he made 6 appearances in league matches and 1 in Belgian Cup.

International career 

Talvitie made his debut in international football in Algarve on 22 November 2019 at the age 15 playing for Finland U15 in a 3–2 defeat against Spain U15.

References

External links

 Lommel SK official profile
 

2005 births
Living people
Finnish footballers
Association football forwards
Association football wingers
Finland youth international footballers
Lommel S.K. players
Challenger Pro League players
Finnish expatriate footballers
Expatriate footballers in Belgium
Finnish expatriate sportspeople in Belgium